The Hujariyya were a special training corps in the Fatimid army, expanded to an elite cavalry corps of 3,000–5,000 men at the turn of the 12th century.

History
The name derives from the word for 'chamber, room', and refers to troops housed and trained in or near the caliphal palace and its chambers. Such an institution existed in the Abbasid Caliphate during the early 10th century. 

The Fatimid caliph al-Mu'izz established a palace training school at the caliphal palace in Cairo, aiming to train officers in the art of war. The eminent Fatimid general Anushtekin al-Dizbari was taught in this institution, but graduated early after only three years. The general and future vizier in 1149–1154, al-Adil ibn al-Sallar, was also a graduate.

The function of the school was transformed by the vizier al-Afdal Shahanshah in the late 11th century, who found that his troops were inferior to the Crusaders. From a selective institution open only to a few, al-Afdal expanded the Hujariyya to a fully-fledged military corps by recruiting 3,000 youngsters from the sons of the military and civil elites, with the purpose of creating horsemen capable of matching the Turkish  (slave-soldier cavalry) in skill. The cadets were under the supervision of tutors (s) for a period of several years, during which they were taught various subjects and skills. After graduation, the soldiers were known as the 'youths of the household'. Sometime after al-Afdal's tenure, the corps rose further to 5,000 men.

References

Sources
 
 
 
 

Military history of the Fatimid Caliphate
Cairo under the Fatimid Caliphate
10th-century establishments in the Fatimid Caliphate
Military academies